The Beautiful and Damned is a 1922 American silent drama film directed by William A. Seiter and released by Warner Bros. The film, based on F. Scott Fitzgerald's 1922 novel The Beautiful and Damned, starred Kenneth Harlan and Marie Prevost.

Cast
Marie Prevost as Gloria
Kenneth Harlan as Anthony
Harry Myers as Dick
Tully Marshall as Adam Patch
Louise Fazenda as Muriel
Cleo Ridgely as Dot
Emmett King as Mr. Gilbert
Walter Long as Hull
Clarence Burton as Bloeckman
J. Parker McConnell as Maury
Charles McHugh as Shuttleworth
Kathleen Key as Rachel
George Kuwa as Tanner

Production
To publicize the film, Jack L. Warner, announced that the film's stars, Kenneth Harlan and Marie Prevost, would marry on the film's set. The publicity stunt worked and thousands of fans sent gifts and letters to the couple. However, Warner was unaware that Prevost was still secretly married to her first husband, Sonny Gerke. The Los Angeles Mirror got wind of Prevost's first marriage and ran a story with the headline "Marie Prevost Will Be a Bigamist if She Marries Kenneth Harlan". Warner was livid over the negative publicity and Prevost's failure to disclose her first marriage despite the fact that the publicity stunt was his idea. Warner quickly arranged an annullment, and when the publicity surrounding the scandal died down, Prevost and Harlan quietly married.

Reception
The film did well at the box office and critics were generally favorable. According to Warner Bros. records the film earned $327,000 domestically and $22,000 from foreign markets.

F. Scott Fitzgerald, however, disliked the film. He later wrote to a friend "It's by far the worst movie I've ever seen in my life-cheap, vulgar, ill-constructed and shoddy. We were utterly ashamed of it."

Preservation status
The film is currently listed as a lost film, and no copies of The Beautiful and Damned are known to exist. Warner Bros. records of the film's negative have a notation, "Junked 12/27/48" (i.e., December 27, 1948). Warner Bros. destroyed many of its pre-1933 nitrate film negatives in the late 1940s and 1950s due to their decomposition.

References

External links

 
 
 
 

1922 films
1922 drama films
Silent American drama films
American silent feature films
American black-and-white films
Films based on American novels
Films based on works by F. Scott Fitzgerald
Films directed by William A. Seiter
Lost American films
Warner Bros. films
1922 lost films
Lost drama films
1923 drama films
1923 films
1920s American films